Geoffrey Taylor (born 22 April 1950) is a Fijian sailor. He competed in the Finn event at the 1996 Summer Olympics.

References

External links
 

1950 births
Living people
Fijian male sailors (sport)
Olympic sailors of Fiji
Sailors at the 1996 Summer Olympics – Finn
Sailors from Sydney